Florbel Pérez (born 7 June 1928) is a Uruguayan former swimmer. He competed in two events at the 1948 Summer Olympics.

References

External links
  

1928 births
Possibly living people
Uruguayan male swimmers
Olympic swimmers of Uruguay
Swimmers at the 1948 Summer Olympics
Sportspeople from Montevideo
20th-century Uruguayan people